82 G. Eridani (HD 20794, HR 1008, e Eridani) is a star  away from Earth in the constellation Eridanus. It is a main-sequence star with a stellar classification of G6 V, and it hosts a system of at least three planets and a dust disk.

Observation
In the southern-sky catalog Uranometria Argentina, 82 G. Eridani (sometimes abbreviated to "82 Eridani") is the 82nd star listed in the constellation Eridanus. The Argentina catalog, compiled by the 19th-century astronomer Benjamin Gould, is a southern celestial hemisphere analog of the more famous Flamsteed catalog, and uses a similar numbering scheme. 82 G. Eridani, like other stars near the Sun, has held on to its Gould designation, even while other more distant stars have not.

Properties
This star is slightly smaller and less massive than the Sun, making it marginally dimmer than the Sun in terms of luminosity; it is about a third more luminous than Tau Ceti or Alpha Centauri B. The projected equatorial rotation rate (v sin i) is 4.0 km/s, compared to 2 km/s for the Sun.

82 G. Eridani is a high-velocity star—it is moving quickly compared to the average—and hence is probably a member of Population II, generally older stars whose motions take them well outside the plane of the Milky Way. Like many other Population II stars, 82 G. Eridani is somewhat metal-deficient (though much less deficient than many), and is older than the Sun. It has a relatively high orbital eccentricity of 0.40 about the galaxy, ranging between 4.6 and 10.8 kiloparsecs from the core. Estimates of the age of this star ranged from 6 to 12 billion years.

This star is located in a region of low-density interstellar matter (ISM), so it is believed to have a large astropause that subtends an angle of 6″ across the sky. Relative to the Sun, this star is moving at a space velocity of 101 km/s, with the bow shock advancing at more than Mach 3 through the ISM.

Planetary system 

An infrared excess was discovered around the star by the Infrared Space Observatory at 60 μm, but was not later confirmed by the Spitzer Space Telescope, in 2006. However, in 2012, a dust disk was found around the star, by the Herschel Space Observatory. While not well-constrained, if assumed to have a similar composition to 61 Virginis' dust disk, it has a semi-major axis of 19 AU.

On August 17, 2011, European astronomers announced the discovery of three planets orbiting 82 G. Eridani. The mass range of these planets classifies them as super-Earths; objects with only a few times the Earth's mass. These planets were discovered by precise measurements of the radial velocity of the star, with the planets revealing their presence by their gravitational displacement of the star during each orbit. None of the planets display a significant orbital eccentricity. However, their orbital periods are all 90 days or less, indicating that they are orbiting close to the host star.

The number of planets in the system is slightly uncertain. At the time of planet c's detection, it exerted the lowest gravitational perturbation. There was also a similarity noted between its orbital period and the rotational period of the star. For these reasons the discovery team were somewhat more cautious regarding the verity of its candidate planet status than for the other two. Continued observation of the star will be required to determine the exact nature of the planetary system.

Using the TERRA algorithm, developed by Guillem Anglada-Escudé and R. Paul Butler in 2012, to describe better and filter out noise interference to extract more precise radial velocity measurements, a team of scientists led by Fabo Feng, in 2017, provided evidence for up to three more planets. One such candidate, of Neptune mass, 82 G. Eridani f, may orbit in the habitable zone of the star. The team also believe that, using these noise reduction techniques, they are able to better quantify the descriptions for the earlier 3 exoplanets, but only have weak evidence of 82 G. Eridani c.

A study in 2023 could only confirm planets b & d, and did not significantly detect the other planet candidates. In particular, the statistical significance of planet c would be expected to increase with additional data; the fact that this has not happened casts doubt on its existence. The 40-day radial velocity signal may instead be tied to the stellar rotation. The additional three candidates found in 2017 (e, f, g) could not be confirmed or refuted.

Habitability
In his 1970 book Habitable Planets for Man, Stephen Dole gave 82 G. Eridani his highest estimate for habitability: 5.7%. Four other stars had this figure: Alpha Centauri B, 70 Ophiuchi A, Eta Cassiopeiae A, and Delta Pavonis. 82 G. Eridani (GJ 139) was also picked as a Tier 1 target star for NASA's proposed Space Interferometry Mission (SIM) mission to search for terrestrial-sized or larger planets.

See also
 Map analysis of the 1961 Zeta Reticuli Incident (a purported alien abduction)

References

External links
 

G-type main-sequence stars
Eridani, 82
Planetary systems with three confirmed planets

Eridanus (constellation)
Eridani, e
1008
Durchmusterung objects
0139
Eridani, 82
020794
015510